J. Lee Hill Jr., is the first Missioner for Racial Justice and Healing for The Episcopal Diocese of Virginia.  He has served in ministry since 1999, and is an ordained minister with recognized standing in the Alliance of Baptists and the United Church of Christ.

Education 
He attended Florida A&M and graduated from George Mason University with a Bachelor of Arts in integrative studies with a concentration in management and leadership, and earned a Master of Divinity from Wake Forest University, a Master of Theology from Columbia Theological Seminary, and a Doctor of Ministry from Emory University  He received the Bill J. Leonard Distinguished Service Award Pro Fide et Humanitate   for his work and advocacy as a public theologian, and holds several diplomas and certificates from Morehouse, Princeton, University of San Diego, and the Shalem Institute for Spiritual Formation.

His research interests include preaching, social justice, contemplative studies, and emerging models of Narrative Leadership.

Career 
Hill served on the ministerial staff of Knollwood Baptist Church in Winston-Salem, North Carolina, where he became the first African-American ordained to Christian Ministry through that Alliance/American Baptist congregation.  Before joining the staff of The Riverside Church in the City of New York, he was a ministerial intern at Metro Baptist Church in Hells Kitchen, New York, and most recently served as the senior pastor of Christian Fellowship Congregational Church (UCC).

Personal life 
Hill was born in the Commonwealth of Virginia,and is the father of two sons.

References 

Living people
African-American Christian clergy
American Christian clergy
Baptist ministers from the United States
Florida A&M University people
George Mason University alumni
Wake Forest University alumni
People from San Diego
United Church of Christ
United Church of Christ members
Year of birth missing (living people)
21st-century African-American people